"Party Starter" is a song by American rapper Will Smith. It was released as the second single from his fourth studio album Lost and Found. The song was written by Smith alongside American rapper Ludacris, with production from Polow da Don. It was Smith's final single before he took a 12-year break in music.

Background
The hook and 1st verse describe a club environment, while the 2nd and 3rd verses criticize the commercial "dumbing down" of the current-day hip hop scene innate of the song itself.

Track listings
UK CD1
 "Party Starter" (radio edit) – 4:22
 "Party Starter" (instrumental) – 4:33
 "Party Starter" (a cappella) – 4:07

UK CD2
 "Party Starter" (radio edit) – 4:22
 "Party Starter" (Freshman Remix) – 4:15
 "Party Starter" (Co-P Grimey Mix) – 4:30
 "Party Starter" (video) – 4:22

Charts

References

Songs about parties
2004 songs
2005 singles
Will Smith songs
Interscope Records singles
Song recordings produced by Polow da Don
Songs written by Polow da Don
Songs written by Ludacris
Songs written by Will Smith